Ohio County is the name of three counties in the United States:

Ohio County, Indiana 
Ohio County, Kentucky 
Ohio County, West Virginia, formerly in Virginia

See also
Ohio Country